Amir Jafari is an Iranian actor born on September 1, 1974 Tehran, Iran.

Personal life

Jafari is married Rima Raminfar and has one son.

Filmography

Cinema

He learned Acting from Hamid Samandarian (1931 - 2012) one of the most remarkable acting teachers in Iran. He has started acting in cinema since 2001. His first movie was Bread, Love, Motorcycle 1000.

Actor

Director assistant

Series

Awards
 Best actor, Fajr International Theater Festival, 1999
 Best comedian, 2002

References

External links

 

Living people
Iranian male actors
Iranian male stage actors
Iranian male television actors
Iranian male film actors
Islamic Azad University alumni
1974 births
People from Tehran